Echinacea pallida, the pale purple coneflower, is a species of herbaceous perennial plant in the family Asteraceae. It is sometimes grown in gardens and used for medicinal purposes. Its native range is the central region of the United States.

Description
Plants normally grow with one unbranched stem in the wild, but often produce multi-stemmed clumps in gardens. They have deep taproots that are  spindle shaped, wider in the center and narrowing at the ends. Stems are green or mottled with purple and green. The leaves are elongated lanceolate or linear-lanceolate with three veins. The flowers have white pollen. Echinacea pallida blooms from May into July. The fruits are cypselae and are tan or bi-colored with angled edges.

Distribution
It is found in the Mississippi Valley, the southeastern Great Plains, and the region south of Lake Michigan. Most of the known populations are in the region from southern Wisconsin and Iowa south to Louisiana and eastern Texas, with additional reports (many of them likely from introductions) in the Southeastern United States, New England, New York, Michigan, and Ontario.

Habitat and range
The states of Tennessee and Wisconsin list the species as threatened, mostly due to habitat loss and over-collection of roots, which are made into herbal medicine. The use of Echinacea as a medicinal plant has not been demonstrated to have any positive health effects. It is a larval host to the silvery checkerspot.

Gallery

References

pallida
Flora of the United States
Plants described in 1834